The 2020 CEBL–U Sports Draft is the second CEBL Draft, being revealed on March 26. Seven Canadian Elite Basketball League (CEBL) teams will select 21 athletes in total.

Format
the draft order for the first round is determine by how the teams finished in the 2019 CEBL season, with the Ottawa Blackjacks getting the first overall, and for the rest is last place, to the league champion. A "snake draft" was used, with the order reversing in even-numbered rounds, and the original order in odd-numbered rounds. The draft order for the first round was determined as follows:
 Ottawa Blackjacks
 Fraser Valley Bandits
 Guelph Knighthawks
 Edmonton Stingers
 Niagara River Lions
 Hamilton Honey Badgers
 Saskatchewan Rattlers

Player selection
Source:

Round 1

Round 2

Round 3

References

Canadian Elite Basketball League
2019–20 in Canadian basketball